Baithalangso is a village in the West Karbi Anglong district of Assam, India.

See also 
 West Karbi Anglong district
 Baithalangso (Vidhan Sabha constituency)

References 

Villages in West Karbi Anglong district